Marcel Beekman (born 3 September 1969) is a Dutch operatic tenor currently based in Amsterdam, The Netherlands. Born in Zwolle,  Beekman sang as a boy soprano and studied singing  with Frauke Vonk. His first recording appeared in 1979. In 1993 he completed his vocal studies at the Conservatory in Zwolle with Felix Schoonenboom and continued his education with Margreet Honig in Amsterdam.

Marcel Beekman is renowned for his interpretation of operatic character roles as well as early and contemporary music performances.
He has performed the great German, French and Italian baroque repertoire all over Europe, the United States, Middle East, South Africa and Japan in major concert venues and festivals with specialized conductors such as William Christie, Leonardo García Alarcón, Frans Brüggen, Christophe Rousset, Richard Egarr, Reinhard Goebel, Aapo Häkkinen and António Carrilho. He has performed later repertoire as well with Sir Simon Rattle, Daniele Gatti, Lawrence Renes, Sir Mark Elder, Iván Fischer, Jérémie Rhorer, Claus Peter Flor, Ariane Matiakh, Steven Sloane and Ed Spanjaard, with orchestras including the Royal Concertgebouw Orchestra, Wiener Philharmoniker, Berliner Philharmoniker, Los Angeles Philharmonic, Orchestra of the 18th Century, Les Arts Florissants, Cappella Mediterranea, Helsinki Baroque Orchestra, Collegium 1740, ASKO|Schönberg, Orchestre de Chambre de Paris, Orchestre Philharmonique du Luxembourg, Stavanger Symfoniorkester, Israel Camerata and Orchestra Sinfonica di Milano Giuseppe Verdi.

Marcel is also known for his outstanding ability in more avant-garde repertoire. He has worked extensively with conductors such as Reinbert de Leeuw, Sylvain Cambreling, John Adams, Marc Albrecht, Avner Biron and Jonathan Stockhammer in works by Igor Stravinsky, Alban Berg, Benjamin Britten, Nicolas Obouchov, Pascal Dusapin, Edison Denisov, Mauricio Kagel, Witold Lutoslawski, Joseph Bardanashvili, Gottfried von Einem and György Kurtág. Marcel has given many world premières that have been specially composed for his voice: Calliope Tsoupaki [St. Luke’s Passion, Greek Love Songs, Oidípous, Liknón and Exodión], Martijn Padding, Roderik de Man, Micha Hamel, Elmer Schönberger, Jacques Bank, António Chagas Rosa and Jeff Hamburg have written specifically for him, as have the younger generation of Dutch composers such as Reza Namavar, Joost Kleppe, Anke Brouwer, Bart Visman and Matthias Kadar.

Operatic repertoire includes Berenice L’Ipermestra Cavalli [released on CD in 2019], Nodrice La Finta Pazza Sacrati, the title role in Rameau’s Platée, the title role in Pygmalion and Valère, Damon, Don Carlos Les Indes Galantes Rameau, Maître de Musique and Maître de Chant Les Fêtes Vénitiennes Campra, Nurse Granida P.C. Hooft, Arnalta and Nutrice L’Incoronazione di Poppea [the 2018 Salzburg production is available on CD and DVD at Harmonia Mundi], Eumete Il ritorno d’Ulisse in patria and the title role in Orfeo Monteverdi, Lope Don Chisciotte in Sierra Morena Conti, Germanico Arminio Biber, Pedrillo Die Entführung aus dem Serail, Basilio and Don Curzio Le Nozze di Figaro Mozart, Skrjagin Skupoy Pashkevich, Prince Nilski Igrok Prokofiev, Adrian Der Sturm Martin, Ein Tanzmeister Ariadne auf Naxos, 1., 2. and 4. Jude Salome Strauss [“…the well-executed quintet of bickering Jews was dominated by Marcel Beekman’s lacerant tenor…”], Le Cabaretier Benvenuto Cellini Berlioz [available on DVD], Ulrich Eisslinger Die Meistersinger von Nürnberg Wagner, Mime Das Rheingold and Siegfried Wagner, Hauptmann and Narr Wozzeck Alban Berg, Primo Sacerdote Il Prigioniero Dallapiccola, Pégase, Sénéchal and Prêtre L’écume des jours Edison Denisov [International Diaghilev Award 2013], the title role in Jonah the Naysayer Willem Breuker, Arthur Rimbaud Nuit de l’enfer Roderik de Man, Laki Topalović Maratonci Isidora Žebeljan, Zamar Legende Peter-Jan Wagemans, Ricardo Laika Martijn Padding, Casella La Commedia and Pope Innocenzo XI Theatre of the World Louis Andriessen. Dutch national press unanimously applauded him for this latter role, being “a distinctively formidable Pope, touching and brilliant”. Los Angeles Philharmonic released a double CD of the production on the Nonesuch label in autumn 2017 which was nominated for the BBC Music Magazine Awards 2018 in the category opera.

Marcel Beekman has worked at Dutch National Opera, Theater an der Wien, Opéra Comique de Paris, Gran Teatre del Liceu Barcelona [“Beekman made his high tenor shine at the Liceu in a splendid performance” according to Scherzo in 2021], Théâtre du Capitole Toulouse, Staatstheater Stuttgart, Salzburger Festspiele, Bregenzer Festspiele, Opéra de Dijon, Opéra Royal de Versailles, Grand Théâtre de Luxembourg,  Holland Festival, Brooklyn Academy of Music, Lincoln Center and Carnegie Hall New York with directors Robert Carsen, Barrie Kosky, Pierre Audi, Ivo van Hove, Claus Guth, Jean-Yves Ruf, Stefan Herheim, Tatjana Gürbaca [the press referred to Beekman’s Mime in her Vienna Ring-Trilogie of 2017 as “ausgezeichnet“, “mit schnarrendem Tenor ein genial winselnder Mime“, “ungemein wortdeutlich“, “ein köstlich-keifender Mime“ and “il flessuosissimo tenore olandese Marcel Beekman risplende in una parte più che controversa, indossando la kippah“], Hal Hartley, Nicola Raab, Jan Lauwers, Marcel Sijm and Krzysztof Warlikowski. The latter staged DNO’s 2017 production of Wozzeck in which Beekman’s interpretation of Der Hauptmann was described internationally as excellent and outstanding; sadistic and maniacal as well as “eccezionale” and “absolument unique”. The TV-registration of this production was released on DVD.

At the Salzburger Festspiele Marcel Beekman performed the roles of Artistée and Pluton in Offenbach’s Orphée aux Enfers. This successful production [conducted by Enrique Mazzola and directed by Barrie Kosky] is available on DVD at Unitel Edition. “Pour l’union du mot et de la note, c’est à Marcel Beekman que revient la palme, Pluton parfaitement idiomatique, voguant d’un pas léger sur les hauteurs où le mène son ténor stratosphérique” wrote Diapason Magazine, and [according to Frankfurter Allgemeine Zeitung] “Der Pluto des brillant singenden Tenors Marcel Beekman, der mit Koloraturen der Königin der Nacht eine virtuose Falsett-Einlage bietet.” 
The long lasting effect of the international Platée success led to recording sessions for television, cd and dvd/Blu-ray at Theater an der Wien, the result of which is released at Unitel Edition in the summer of 2021. Austrian press wrote: “Beekman wiederholt seine phänomenal komische wie berührende Leistung”, “Glanzvoll wie einst bei der Premiere dominiert der niederländische Tenor die Szene” and “Vor allem lebt diese Platée aber immer noch von Marcel Beekman in der Titelpartie”.
 
After the 2020/21 pandemic, the future looks brighter than ever with opera productions in the Bochum Ruhrtriennale [Bählamms Fest by Olga Neuwirth conducted by Sylvain Cambreling and directed by Bush Moukarzel & Ben Kidd], Tchaikovsky’s Eugene Onegin at Théâtre des Champs-Elysées [Karina Canellakis conducts, Stéphane Braunschweig stages], Les Contes d’Hoffmann by Offenbach [Mark Minkowski and Johannes Erath] at Les Arts Reina Sofia in Valencia, a different Platée [staging by Calixto Bieito] in Stuttgart and concert performances in Amsterdam [Concertgebouw Zaterdagmatinee] and Lithuania [recitals in Vilnius and Kaunas].

References

External links 
 
 
 

1969 births
Living people
People from Zwolle
Dutch operatic tenors
20th-century Dutch male opera singers
21st-century Dutch male opera singers